New West Motel is the fifth studio album by alternative rock band The Walkabouts. It was released in 1993 on Sub Pop Records. It is a double album, where all songs are credited to Chris Eckman or/and The Walkabouts except for a cover of Texan cult musician Townes Van Zandt's "Snake Mountain Blues".

Critical reception 

Jason Ankeny writing in a positive review for AllMusic said that it features "edgy juxtaposition of blistering guitar workouts and plaintive acoustic cuts."

Track listing
All songs written by The Walkabouts, except where noted. All lyrics written by Chris Eckman, except where noted.

 "Jack Candy" – 4:41
 "Sundowner" – 3:38
 "Grand Theft Auto" – 5:41
 "Break It Down Gently" – 3:36
 "Your Hope Shines" – 4:14
 "Murdering Stone" – 3:18
 "Sweet Revenge" – 5:44
 "Glad Nation's Death Song" – 4:21
 "Long Time Here" – 4:19
 "Wondertown (Part One)" – 1:23
 "Drag This River" – 4:02
 "Snake Mountain Blues" (Townes Van Zandt) – 5:47
 "Findlay's Motel" (string arrangement by Mark Nichols) – 6:36 
 "Unholy Dreams" – 5:21

The album was produced during November and December 1992. It was engineered at Clearwater Productions, Gig Harbor, Washington and Bad Animals Seattle, Washington.

Personnel 

The Walkabouts
 Terri Moeller – drums, percussions, backup vocals
 Bruce Wirth – violin, lap steel guitar, mandolin, vibes
 Glenn Slater – piano, organ, noises, accordion
 Michael Wells – bass, harmonica
 Carla Torgerson – vocals, acoustic guitars, electric guitars, percussion
 Chris Eckman – vocals, acoustic guitars, electric guitars

Bravura String Quartet
strings on "Findlay's Motel"
 Steven Toda – violin
 Dave Beck – cello
 Gregg Rice – violin
 Sam Williams – viola

King Jesus Disciples
vocals on "Your Hopes Shines"
 Roosevelt Franklin
 Johnny Gray
 James Young

Additional musicians
 Mark Nichols – conducting of the string arrangement on "Findlay's Motel" 

Technical
 The Walkabouts – production
 Ed Brooks – production, engineering
 Kevin Suggs – assistant engineering
 Joe York – assistant engineering
 Jim Haviland – chief technical advisor
 Tony Kroes – pre-production for Second Nature Productions
 Gary Smith – pre-production for Fort Apache
 Paul Kolderie – pre-production for Fort Apache
 John Saba – guitar technician for Stephens Stringed Instruments
 Michael Taponga – drum technician

Design
 Ben Thompson – cover design, cover painting (digital)
 Tony Kroegs – cover painting (analog), band photo
 Kevin Gibson – band photo, shot at the Five-O Tavern.

Release history

References

1993 albums
The Walkabouts albums
Sub Pop albums